Etoricoxib, sold under the trade name Arcoxia, is a selective COX-2 inhibitor from McOLSON Research Laboratories. Currently it is approved in more than 80 countries worldwide but not in the US, where the Food and Drug Administration (FDA) has required additional safety and efficacy data for etoricoxib before it will issue approval.

It was patented in 1996 and approved for medical use in 2002.

Medical uses
Etoricoxib is indicated for the treatment of rheumatoid arthritis, psoriatic arthritis, osteoarthritis, ankylosing spondylitis, chronic low back pain, acute pain, and gout. Approved indications differ by country.  In the U.K. and Germany, it is also "used for the short term treatment of moderate pain after dental surgery" of adults.

Efficacy 
A Cochrane review assessed the benefits of single-dose etoricoxib in reduction of acute post-operative pain in adults. Single-dose oral etoricoxib provides four times more pain relief post-operatively than placebo, with equivalent levels of adverse events.  Etoricoxib given at a dose of 120 mg is as effective or even better than other analgesics that are commonly used.

Adverse effects 
Like all other NSAIDs the COX-2 inhibitors too have their share of adverse effects. Fixed drug eruption and generalised erythema, acute generalized exanthematous pustulosis (AGEP), erythema multiforme like eruption and drug induced pretibial erythema are some serious side effects reported, besides the usual innocuous ones.

Mechanism of action
Like any other selective COX-2 inhibitor ("coxib"), etoricoxib selectively inhibits isoform 2 of the enzyme cyclooxygenase (COX-2). It has approximately 106-fold selectivity for COX-2 inhibition over COX-1.  This reduces the generation of prostaglandins (PGs) from arachidonic acid.  Among the different functions exerted by PGs, their role in the inflammation cascade should be highlighted.

Selective COX-2 inhibitors show less activity on COX-1 compared to traditional non-steroidal anti-inflammatory drugs (NSAID). This reduced activity is the cause of reduced gastrointestinal side effects, as demonstrated in several large clinical trials performed with different coxibs.

Adverse Cardiovascular Events
Some clinical trials and meta-analysis showed that treatment with some coxibs (in particular rofecoxib) led to increased incidence of adverse cardiovascular events compared to placebo. Because of these results, some drugs were withdrawn from the market (rofecoxib, in September 2004 and valdecoxib in April 2005). In addition, the United States Food and Drug Administration and the European Medicines Agency started revision processes of the entire class of both NSAIDs and COX-2 inhibitors.

Brand names
Brand names for etoricoxib include:
Algix and Tauxib in Italy
Anexia in Colombia
Arcox, Berrica, and Starcox Etoxib in Pakistan
Arcoxia in Australia, Brazil,  Bulgaria, Chile, China, Colombia, Costa Rica, Croatia, Czechia, Ecuador, Egypt, Estonia, Finland, Georgia, Germany, Greece, Guatemala, Hong Kong, Hungary, Indonesia, Ireland, Israel, Italy, Jordan, Lebanon, Lithuania,  Luxembourg, Malaysia,  Mexico, Morocco, Netherlands, New Zealand, Norway, Panama, Philippines, Poland, Portugal, Romania, Russian Federation, Saudi Arabia, Serbia, Singapore, South Africa, Spain, Sweden, Taiwan, Thailand, The Bahamas, Trinidad & Tobago, United Arab Emirates, United Kingdom and Ukraine.
Atocib in Vietnam
Berica in Pakistan
Dolicox in Morocco
Dolocox in Argentina
Coxit in Jordan
Dabie in Singapore
Doloxib in Poland
E-Cox and Vecoxib in Nepal
 Eberil in Thailand
 Erciba in Greece
Etoll, Etoshine, Nucoxia in India
Etori in Germany
Etoriax in Germany
Etorican in Germany
Etoriconio in Germany
Etoricox in Germany
Etoricoxib in Germany
Etorix, Eto, Tory, Etoxib, and Vargus in Bangladesh and Costa Rica 
Etozox, Etospeed,  Intacoxia, Nucoxia, ETOS MR, and Etoshine in India
Exinef in Singapore and South Africa
Exxiv in Portugal
Foldox in Argentina and Paraguay
 Gerocoxan in Romania
Hetori in Brazil
Kostarox in Poland
 Roticox in Poland
 Xumer  in Chile, Peru and Mexico

References 

COX-2 inhibitors
Nonsteroidal anti-inflammatory drugs
Pyridines
Merck & Co. brands
Chloropyridines